Jamie Murray and Bruno Soares were the defending champions, but chose not to participate together. Murray played alongside his brother Andy but lost in the quarterfinals to Raven Klaasen and Michael Venus. Soares teamed up with Mate Pavić but lost in the first round to Jean-Julien Rojer and Horia Tecău.

Klaasen and Venus went on to win the title, defeating Rojer and Tecău in the final, 3−6, 6−3, [10−2].

Seeds

Draw

Draw

Qualifying

Seeds

Qualifiers
  Matthew Ebden /  Nicholas Monroe

Qualifying draw

References

Sources
 Main Draw
 Qualifying Draw

Citi Open - Men's Doubles